Vellanki is a suburb of the city of Visakhapatnam state of Andhra Pradesh, India. It is in Anandapuram Mandal.

about
Vellanki is 2km from Anandapuram and is well connected with national highway. recently this area is changing from village to urban and presently so many international schools are situated here.

References

Neighbourhoods in Visakhapatnam